Andaz is a 1994 Indian Hindi action comedy film directed by David Dhawan, starring Anil Kapoor, Juhi Chawla, Karishma Kapoor and Kader Khan. Other cast members include Raj Babbar, Shakti Kapoor, Satish Kaushik, Ishrat Ali, Mahesh Anand, Vikas Anand and Tej Sapru. It is a remake of Tamil film Sundara Kandam (1992), starring K. Bhagyaraj and Bhanupriya. The film was the 13th highest grossing Bollywood film of 1994.

Plot

Ajay (Anil Kapoor) an intelligent ex-student of the S. T. School is appointed in the same school as a teacher. Jaya (Karisma Kapoor), who studies in his class harasses him by playing mischievous pranks. Ajay's refusal to enter into a romantic relationship with Jaya upsets her. She challenges him that she will one day become his wife. In a hurry he marries Saraswati (Juhi Chawla), an illiterate orphan girl. Jaya befriends Saraswati by teaching her everything from cooking to reading and writing. One day, some terrorists attack the school and take the children as hostages. Ajay, Jaya and all are trapped. In between Jaya gives her life to save Ajay, there Saraswati reveals that she knows about Jaya's love for Ajay and asks Ajay to marry her on the spot by putting a mangalsutra around her neck. Jaya refuses saying that she will come back in their lives again, this time as Ajay's and Saraswati's daughter.

Cast

 Anil Kapoor as Ajay Kumar Saxena 
 Juhi Chawla as Saraswati Saxena 
 Karisma Kapoor as Jaya
 Raj Babbar as Captain
 Mahesh Anand as Chote, terrorist
 Tej Sapru as Bhola, terrorist
 Govind Namdev as terrorist
 Vishwajeet Pradhan as terrorist 
 Kader Khan as Principal
 Shakti Kapoor as Shagun
 Kunika as Shobha Teacher
 Satish Kaushik as Panipuri Sharma
 Dina Pathak as Dadi in Photo Frame
 Himani Shivpuri as Panipuri's wife
 Ishrat Ali as an Indian Army Officer
 Vikas Anand as Army Officer and father of Jaya
 Harish Patel as Minister
 Subbiraj as Col. Anand Viraj. (Uncredited Role) (Killed at beginning of Movie)
 Deven Bhojani as Ajay, Student
 Vinay Sapru as Govind, Student
 Javed Hyder as Chunky Pandey, Student

Soundtrack
The music is scored by Bappi Lahiri, with lyrics by Indeevar and notable singers Kumar Sanu, Abhijeet Bhattacharya, Udit Narayan, Kavita Krishnamurthy, Alka Yagnik, Vinod Rathod, Sadhana Sargam and Sudesh Bhosle.

References

External links 
 

1994 films
1990s Hindi-language films
Films directed by David Dhawan
Hindi remakes of Telugu films
Films scored by Bappi Lahiri
Hindi remakes of Tamil films